This is a list of the National Register of Historic Places listings in Cambria County, Pennsylvania.

This is intended to be a complete list of the properties and districts on National Register of Historic Places in the Cambria County, Pennsylvania.  The locations of National Register properties and districts for which the latitude and longitude coordinates are included below, may be seen in a map.

There are 31 properties and districts listed on the National Register in the county. Two sites are further designated as National Historic Landmarks and another is designated as a National Memorial.

Current listings

|}

See also 

 List of Pennsylvania state historical markers in Cambria County

References 

Cambria County